Corgatha zonalis is a moth of the family Erebidae first described by Francis Walker in 1859. It is found in Oriental tropics of India and from Sri Lanka to Borneo, the Philippines and Japan.

References

Moths of Asia
Moths described in 1859
Boletobiinae